The AFC Solidarity Cup is an international football competition for Asian Football Confederation (AFC) member countries who are out of the continental qualifiers at early stage. The tournament was created following the termination of the AFC Challenge Cup.

Format
The competition currently features a maximum 10 national teams, where each team is guaranteed a minimum of 4 matches. The first edition took place in November 2016 and the second edition, scheduled for November and December 2020, was cancelled due to COVID-19 pandemic in Asia.

Results

</onlyinclude>

Successful national teams

Champions by region

Participating nations

Legend

For each tournament, the number of teams in each of the finals tournament are shown.

Summary

 The Northern Mariana Islands made their AFC Solidarity Cup debut after having been approved by the AFC to participate (the Northern Mariana Islands is an associate member of the AFC)

Awards

Winning coaches

See also
 AFC Challenge Cup

References

External links
AFC Solidarity Cup, the-AFC.com

 
Asian Football Confederation competitions for national teams
Recurring sporting events established in 2016
Quadrennial sporting events